Birth/The End is the first full-length album from the melodic heavy metal band Agonizer, released in August 2007.

Track listing

Personnel

Agonizer
Pasi Kärkkäinen - lead vocals
Jari-Pekka Perälä - guitar, backing vocals
Joni Laine - guitar, backing vocals
Jussi Tikka - bass guitar, backing vocals
Atte Palokangas - drums
Patrik Laine - keyboards

Additional musicians
Anssi Kippo - Additional keyboards, programming

Production
Anssi Kippo - Producing, Recording, Mixing

References 

2007 albums